The Para-Ordnance P14-45 (14.45) is an improved derivative of the successful United States Armed Forces' M1911 pistol. Created by Para-Ordnance (now Para USA) in the 1980s, it was the first ever M1911 derivative to feature a high-capacity double-stack magazine. 

In the late 1980s, Toronto-based Para-Ordnance started selling "high capacity conversion kits" for M1911A1 pistols, consisting of an updated frame with a thicker grip to accommodate a double-stack magazine that was supplied with the kit, which doubled M1911's 7-round magazine capacity to 14; and a new trigger assembly with suitable dimensional changes to fit into the widened grip frame. With the success of the kits, Para-Ordnance began manufacturing complete M1911 pistols of its own in 1990. 

It was a M1911 variant that could do everything at a reasonable price. 

In 1999, the double-action-only LDA modification, was introduced. 

The P14-45 (later 14.45) is the standard model, and as its name hints, it is chambered in .45 ACP and has a magazine capacity of 14. Other versions include P16-40 (16.40) chambered .40 S&W and features a 16-round magazine, and P18-9 (18.9) which is chambered in 9×19mm Parabellum and features an 18-round magazine. 

The Expert is the basic model of 14.45, it features a 5" match-grade barrel, beavertail grip safety, polymer grips and is available in black nitride or stainless finish. 

The Black Ops is the tactical model, differing from the Expert by having a ramped barrel, integral accessory rail, Trijicon Tritium night sights, ambidextrous thumb safety, VZ Operator Machined G10 grips and is coated in IonBond PVD. The Black Ops model is also available in "Recon" variant with a 4.25" barrel, and Combat variant with high-profile sights and a 5.5" barrel.

The Pro Custom is the competition model. It features a match-grade ramped barrel, adjustable sights, ambidextrous thumb safety, and like Black Ops, has G10 grips and coated in IonBond PVD.

References

1911 platform
.45 ACP semi-automatic pistols
Semi-automatic pistols of Canada
Semi-automatic pistols of the United States